Japanese submarine I-55 may refer to one of the following submarines of the Imperial Japanese Navy:

 , a Kaidai-type submarine; renamed I-155 in 1942; surrendered at Kure in 1945; scuttled in 1946

Japanese Navy ship names
Imperial Japanese Navy ship names